The mad scientist (also mad doctor or mad professor) is a stock character of a scientist who is perceived as "mad, bad and dangerous to know" or "insane" owing to a combination of unusual or unsettling personality traits and the unabashedly ambitious, taboo or hubristic nature of their experiments. As a motif in fiction, the mad scientist may be villainous (evil genius) or antagonistic, benign, or neutral; may be insane, eccentric, or clumsy; and often works with fictional technology or fails to recognise or value common human objections to attempting to play God. Some may have benevolent intentions, even if their actions are dangerous or questionable, which can make them accidental antagonists.

History

Prototypes

The prototypical fictional mad scientist was Victor Frankenstein, creator of his eponymous monster, who made his first appearance in 1818, in the novel Frankenstein, or the Modern Prometheus by Mary Shelley. Though the novel's title character, Victor Frankenstein, is a sympathetic character, the critical element of conducting experiments that cross "boundaries that ought not to be crossed", heedless of the consequences, is present in Shelley's novel. Frankenstein was trained as both an alchemist and a modern scientist, which makes him the bridge between two eras of an evolving archetype. The book is said to be a precursor of a new genre, science fiction, although as an example of gothic horror it is connected with other antecedents as well.

The year 1896 saw the publication of H. G. Wells's The Island of Doctor Moreau, in which the titular doctor—a controversial vivisectionist—has isolated himself entirely from civilisation in order to continue his experiments in surgically reshaping animals into humanoid forms, heedless of the suffering he causes.  In 1925, the novelist Alexander Belyaev introduced mad scientists to the Russian people through the novel Professor Dowell's Head, in which the antagonist performs experimental head transplants on bodies stolen from the morgue, and reanimates the corpses.

Cinema depictions

Fritz Lang's movie Metropolis (1927) brought the archetypical mad scientist to the screen in the form of Rotwang, the evil genius whose machines had originally given life to the dystopian city of the title. Rotwang's laboratory influenced many subsequent movie sets with its electrical arcs, bubbling apparatus, and bizarrely complicated arrays of dials and controls. Portrayed by actor Rudolf Klein-Rogge, Rotwang himself is the prototypically conflicted mad scientist; though he is master of almost mystical scientific power, he remains a slave to his own desires for power and revenge. Rotwang's appearance was also influential—the character's shock of flyaway hair, wild-eyed demeanor, and his quasi-fascist laboratory garb have all been adopted as shorthand for the mad scientist "look." Even his mechanical right hand has become a mark of twisted scientific power, echoed notably in Stanley Kubrick's film Dr. Strangelove or: How I Learned to Stop Worrying and Love the Bomb and in the novel The Three Stigmata of Palmer Eldritch (1965) by Philip K. Dick.

A recent survey of 1,000 horror films distributed in the UK between the 1930s and 1980s reveals mad scientists or their creations have been the villains of 30 percent of the films; scientific research has produced 39 percent of the threats; and, by contrast, scientists have been the heroes of a mere 11 percent. Boris Karloff played mad scientists in several of his 1930s and 1940s films.

Movie serials
The Mad scientist was a staple of the Republic/Universal/Columbia movie serials of the 1930s and 40s. Examples include:
"Dr. Zorka" (The Phantom Creeps, 1939)
"Dr. Fu Manchu" (Drums of Fu Manchu, Republic, 1940)
"Dr. Satan" (Mysterious Doctor Satan, 1940)
"Dr. Vulcan" (King of the Rocket Men, 1949)
"Atom Man/Lex Luthor" Atom Man vs. Superman, 1950)

Post–World War II depictions
Mad scientists were most conspicuous in popular culture after World War II. The sadistic human experimentation conducted under the auspices of the Nazis, especially those of Josef Mengele, and the invention of the atomic bomb, gave rise in this period to genuine fears that science and technology had gone out of control. That the scientific and technological build-up during the Cold War brought about increasing threats of unparalleled destruction of the human species did not lessen the impression. Mad scientists frequently figure in science fiction and motion pictures from the period.

Animation
Mad scientists in animation have included Professor Frink, Professor Farnsworth, Rick Sanchez, Rintaro Okabe, and Dr. Heinz Doofenshmirtz.

Walt Disney Pictures had its mainstay Mickey Mouse trying to save his dog Pluto from The Mad Doctor (1933).

Depictions of mad scientists in Warner Brothers' Merrie Melodies/Looney Tunes cartoons include:
Hair-Raising Hare (1946, based on Peter Lorre)
Birth of a Notion (1947, again based on Lorre)
Water, Water Every Hare (1952, based on Boris Karloff)

While both Tom and Jerry dabbled in mad science in a few of the Hanna-Barbera cartoons, an actual mad scientist did not appear until Switchin' Kitten (1961), directed by Gene Deitch.

Other depictions
Monty Python's Flying Circus's "Elephantoplasty" sketch on their Matching Tie and Handkerchief album features an interview with "the international financier and surgeon Reg LeCrisp" (played by Graham Chapman), who could be considered a mad scientist given his unrepentant and even enthusiastic predilection for grafting animal and furniture parts onto human beings (including his most controversial operation: "a pederast onto an Anglican bishop").

See also
 Absent-minded professor
 Boffin
 British scientists (meme)
 Crank (person)
 Creativity techniques
 Creativity and mental illness
 Edisonade, a similar trope, about a brilliant inventor, but of positive attitudes
 Egghead
 Faust
 Fringe science
 Girl Genius
 List of mad scientists
 Mad scientists of Stanislaw Lem
 Josef Mengele
 Shiro Ishii
 Harold Shipman

References

Bibliography
 Allen, Glen Scott (2009). Master Mechanics and Wicked Wizards: Images of the American Scientist from Colonial Times to the Present. Amherst: University of Massachusetts Press. .
 Garboden, Nick (2007). Mad Scientist or Angry Lab Tech: How to Spot Insanity. Portland: Doctored Papers. .
 Haynes, Roslynn Doris (1994). From Faust to Strangelove: Representations of the Scientist in Western Literature. Baltimore: Johns Hopkins University Press. .
 Junge, Torsten; Doerthe Ohlhoff (2004). Wahnsinnig genial: Der Mad Scientist Reader. Aschaffenburg: Alibri. .
 Norton, Trevor (2010). Smoking Ears and Screaming Teeth. (A witty celebration of the great eccentrics...). Century. .
 Schlesinger, Judith (2012). The Insanity Hoax: Exposing the Myth of the Mad Genius. Ardsley-on-Hudson, N.Y. Shrinktunes Media .
 
 Schneider, Reto U. (2008). The Mad Science Book. 100 Amazing Experiments from the History of Science. London: Quercus. .
 Tudor, Andrew (1989). Monsters and Mad Scientists: A Cultural History of the Horror Movie. Oxford: Blackwell. .
 Weart, Spencer R. (1988). Nuclear Fear: A History of Images. Cambridge, Massachusetts: Harvard University Press.
 Levi, Pfaff J. (1956). Wahnsinnig genial: Der Mad Scientist Reader. Aschaffenburg: Alibri. .

External links 

 Gary Hoppenstand, "Dinosaur Doctors and Jurassic Geniuses: The Changing Image of the Scientist in the Lost World Adventure"
 The Scarecrow's Brain – images of the scientist in film, Christopher Frayling
 Breaking Down the Stereotypes of Science by Recruiting Young Scientists
 The Mad Scientist Database with links and Looks
 Mad Science Experiments

 

Ethics of science and technology

Experimental medical treatments in fiction
Stock characters
Cultural depictions of scientists